Montevallo is a city in Shelby County, Alabama, United States. A college town, it is the home of the University of Montevallo, a public liberal arts university with approximately 3,000 students. As of the 2020 census, the population of the city of Montevallo is 7,229.

Geography
Montevallo is located at  (33.1049, -86.8628). A plaque on Reynolds Cemetery Road, just off Alabama State Route 25, in the eastern corner of the town, marks the geographic center of the state of Alabama.  Middle Street, formerly known as Main Street, had its name changed in 1899 for this reason, upon the completion of a new state survey.

History

The area where Montevallo is now was once controlled by the Creek Indians. After being acquired in 1814 Jesse Wilson claimed a small hill on the northern bank of Wilson's Creek by the present Montevallo City Cemetery  and created a homestead there, making it the oldest settlement in Shelby County. Wilson's friends and family followed afterwards and also settled in the area, and a settlement known as Wilson's Hill developed on the site. The settlement's location at almost the exact center of Alabama meant it was considered one of the potential sites for the University of Alabama. In an attempt to encourage the university to choose the site the settlement changed its name to Montevallo, which is Italian for the hill in the valley.

Montevallo was used by local farmers as a market town where they could sell and package their produce. It was incorporated as a city in 1848. In 1853 a railway was built between Montevallo and Selma which allowed further economic growth to Montevallo and in 1856 a coal mine was created nearby leading to further growth.

During the American Civil War, Union troops under the command of James H. Wilson camped in Montevallo in the spring of 1865 and skirmished with Confederates near the railroad depot. After the war, commercial life and growth was dominated by the coal mine owned by Truman Aldrich who leased the mine and attempted to increase production in response to the growing iron industry in the region and the growing city of Birmingham. Starting in 1890, company owned worker housing was built in Montevallo to house miners.

In the early 1890s, residents of Montevallo entered the city in a competition to be selected for the site of the Alabama Girl's Industrial School (later the University of Montevallo) a technical college for white women, raising funds to purchase land and antebellum buildings for the college they won and the college was founded in Montevallo in 1896. Commerce and economic growth increased in Montevallo after the establishment of the college, which was renamed Alabama College in 1919, started admitting men in 1956 and started admitting African Americans in 1968 and became the modern liberal arts University of Montevallo. The university became the main source of commerce in Montevallo and money generated by it was used by the municipal government to build schools. The university also allowed the community some stability during the Great Depression. It quickly took over the coal mine as the major employer in Montevallo, the coal mine closing in 1946.

Demographics

2000 census
As of the census of 2000, there were 4,825 people, 1,711 households, and 946 families residing in the city. The racial makeup of the city was 72.54% White, 25.89% Black or African American, 0.39% Native American, 0.39% Asian, 0.06% Pacific Islander, 0.15% from other races, and 0.58% from two or more races. 1.58% of the population were Hispanic or Latino of any race.

There were 1,711 households, out of which 25.6% had children under the age of 18 living with them, 37.4% were married couples living together, 15.1% had a female householder with no husband present, and 44.7% were non-families. 30.6% of all households were made up of individuals, and 9.9% had someone living alone who was 65 years of age or older. The average household size was 2.30 and the average family size was 2.96.

In the city, the age distribution of the population shows 18.3% under the age of 18, 36.0% from 18 to 24, 21.8% from 25 to 44, 14.1% from 45 to 64, and 9.8% who were 65 years of age or older. The median age was 23 years. For every 100 females, there were 78.1 males. For every 100 females age 18 and over, there were 72.2 males.

The median income for a household in the city was $30,541, and the median income for a family was $40,164. Males had a median income of $36,222 versus $23,705 for females. The per capita income for the city was $16,468. About 14.5% of families and 24.4% of the population were below the poverty line, including 27.6% of those under age 18 and 21.5% of those age 65 or over.

2010 census
As of the census of 2010, there were 6,323 people, 2,346 households, and 1,325 families residing in the city. The racial makeup of the city was 70.2% White, 24.6% Black or African American, 0.3% Native American, 0.6% Asian, 0.0% Pacific Islander, 2.5% from other races, and 1.8% from two or more races. 5.7% of the population were Hispanic or Latino of any race.

There were 2,346 households, out of which 24.0% had children under the age of 18 living with them, 39.0% were married couples living together, 13.9% had a female householder with no husband present, and 43.5% were non-families. 31.9% of all households were made up of individuals, and 9.9% had someone living alone who was 65 years of age or older. The average household size was 2.29 and the average family size was 2.94.

In the city, the age distribution of the population shows 17.7% under the age of 18, 29.1% from 18 to 24, 22.4% from 25 to 44, 19.8% from 45 to 64, and 11.0% who were 65 years of age or older. The median age was 27 years. For every 100 females, there were 82.2 males. For every 100 females age 18 and over, there were 79.0 males.

The median income for a household in the city was $40,417, and the median income for a family was $75,500. Males had a median income of $53,125 versus $31,361 for females. The per capita income for the city was $19,741. About 11.8% of families and 20.9% of the population were below the poverty line, including 23.6% of those under age 18 and 7.5% of those age 65 or over.

2020 census

As of the 2020 United States census, there were 7,229 people, 2,249 households, and 1,234 families residing in the city.

Places of interest

Parnell Memorial Library

The Montevallo Public Library was founded in March 1958 under the leadership of the City of Montevallo and the Montevallo Branch of the American Association of University Women. The President of the Montevallo Branch of AAUW at that time was Dr. Lucille Griffith, who was also serving as Chair of the Montevallo Library Board. The library began modestly as a collection of several hundred books in a small room at City Hall. The first librarian was Lillian Ward.

In 1974 the public library was moved to the Depot-in-the-Park, where Mayme Yarbrough was the librarian. It remained there until a 1978 fire destroyed the building and all its contents. The library was relocated to the City Hall Annex until 1984. At that time, the library was moved to the renovated telephone company switching building that had been donated by Dr. and Mrs. L.C. "Foots" Parnell, Jr., to the City for a public library. The renovation of the building was made possible through the efforts of many people in this community and beyond. From March 1984 until December 2006, that facility served as Montevallo's public library.

In response to the offer from Dr. L. C. Parnell, Jr., to house his Civil War collection in the existing library at 845 Valley Street if an expansion of the library were undertaken, Parnell Memorial Library Foundation was incorporated on March 23, 1998. The mission of the Foundation is to promote funding for expansion of the facilities, services, and programs of Parnell Memorial Library. Emily Pendleton spearheaded the efforts leading to incorporation and to the Foundation's receiving 501(c)3 nonprofit status with the IRS. She was the first President of the Foundation, serving from 1998 until 2001, when Elizabeth Rodgers was elected president.

As community needs grew, and particularly as community arts programming expanded, it was apparent that Montevallo needed a facility that was more than a traditional library. One of the primary agents of community arts programming is the Montevallo Main Street Players. The community theater group began more than thirty years ago and has performed in various city locations, including the Depot-in-the-Park and the City recreational building. For years, members of the Montevallo Main Street Players have needed a theater, complete with an up-to-date lighting and sound system, that they can use consistently for producing plays and storing props.

In June 2001, representatives from the Foundation, the Montevallo Library Board, the Library Staff, the Montevallo Main Street Players, and the City of Montevallo agreed that the community needed a new library in a new location to meet diverse community needs and to house the Parnell Collection of historical books and documents. The group requested that the City locate property suitable for building a new library that would also serve as a community cultural center. In August 2001, Mayor Grady Parker announced that the new facility would be located adjacent to Orr Park where it was subsequently built. Groundbreaking took place on November 1, 2004, and the Grand Opening was held February 25, 2007.

The new library includes an art gallery and a quality theater used by the Montevallo Main Street Players, the public schools, and other area groups. Along with the large meeting room, the theatre is a much-needed venue for productions by touring theatre companies and musical groups as well as for City of Montevallo meetings and other civic gatherings.

Orr Park
Orr Park, located in Montevallo along Shoal Creek offers residents and visitors a natural recreational environment. Orr Park offers two playgrounds, six baseball/softball fields, a walking trail, a football field and a practice field.

Orr Park contains a local attraction dubbed "Tinglewood". In the early 1990s, local artist Tim Tingle, a coal miner by trade, took it upon himself to transform storm-damaged cedar trees into works of art. The carvings feature gnomes, a dragon, and a fish eating a snake, among others.

American Village
The American Village is a classroom and American history and civics education center. The American Village serves the Nation as an educational institution whose mission is to strengthen and renew the foundations of American liberty and self-government by engaging and inspiring citizens and leaders, with a special emphasis on programs for young people.

Notable people
Slade Blackwell, member of the Alabama Senate
Andrew Jackson Caldwell, U.S. Representative from Tennessee from 1883 to 1887
James Hardy, surgeon who performed the first successful human lung transplant. Was born in Newala, a small community outside of Montevallo.
Jim Hayes, former Major League Baseball player for the Washington Senators
Polly Holliday, actress in TV series such as Alice and movies such as All the President's Men and Mrs. Doubtfire.
Frank Ragan King, Commander in the United States Navy who was awarded the Distinguished Service Medal 
Burwell Boykin Lewis, former member of the Alabama House of Representatives and president of the University of Alabama from 1880 to 1885
Robert M. Lightfoot, Jr., 11th director of NASA Marshall Space Flight Center
Fred L. Lowery, Southern Baptist clergyman, born in Montevallo in 1943
Piano "C" Red, (1933–2013), Chicago blues and boogie-woogie pianist, singer and composer
Eugene Bondurant Sledge, United States Marine, university professor, and author

Sister city

The friendly relationship between Echizen Town and Montevallo began in 1995 with a common interest in pottery. Echizen Town is well known for its unusual pottery and the University of Montevallo excels in teaching and creating the art. Echizen Town is also well known in Japan for its high quality crab, rice, and daffodils. Many people often confuse Echizen Town with Echizen City, a larger city to the south of Echizen Town, known for its production of knives and paper.

Gallery

References

External links

 City of Montevallo: Official City Website
  Parnell Memorial Library Foundation:Parnell Memorial Library Foundation

 
Cities in Alabama
Populated places established in 1815
Cities in Shelby County, Alabama
Birmingham metropolitan area, Alabama
1815 establishments in the United States